My Face may refer to:

 "My Face", a 1980 single by Henry Badowski
 "My Face", a 1980 single by John Foxx
 My Face, a 2001 album by Haddaway